Petar Kapisoda (born 26 June 1976) is a Montenegrin former handball player.

Club career
After starting out at his hometown club Lovćen, Kapisoda moved to Crvenka. He later played for Partizan (1994–1996) and Crvena zvezda (1996–1998). Subsequently, Kapisoda returned to his parent club Lovćen, helping them win back-to-back championships in 2000 and 2001.

International career
With FR Yugoslavia, Kapisoda won two bronze medals at the World Championships (1999 and 2001). He also participated in the 2000 Summer Olympics and 2006 European Championship. After the split of Serbia and Montenegro, Kapisoda represented Montenegro at the 2008 European Championship and 2013 World Championship.

Personal life
Kapisoda is the older brother of the late model Filip Kapisoda.

Honours
Partizan
 Handball Championship of FR Yugoslavia: 1994–95, 2002–03
Crvena zvezda
 Handball Championship of FR Yugoslavia: 1996–97, 1997–98
Lovćen
 Handball Championship of FR Yugoslavia: 1999–2000, 2000–01
 Handball Cup of FR Yugoslavia: 2001–02
Bosna Sarajevo
 Handball Championship of Bosnia and Herzegovina: 2007–08, 2008–09, 2009–10, 2010–11
 Handball Cup of Bosnia and Herzegovina: 2007–08, 2008–09, 2009–10

References

External links
 
 
 

1976 births
Living people
Sportspeople from Cetinje
Montenegrin male handball players
Olympic handball players of Yugoslavia
Handball players at the 2000 Summer Olympics
RK Crvenka players
RK Partizan players
RK Crvena zvezda players
RK Zagreb players
Expatriate handball players
Montenegrin expatriate sportspeople in Croatia
Montenegrin expatriate sportspeople in Bosnia and Herzegovina
Montenegrin expatriate sportspeople in Switzerland